Boiling Point is the fifth EP by American rapper Tech N9ne. It was released on October 30, 2012.

Background
Boiling Point is the fourth installment in the K.O.D. Collection. This album is broken up into sections, "Anger", "Madness" and "The Hole", similar to his K.O.D. album.

Guest artists and production
Guests include Aqualeo, Bishop, Brotha Lynch Hung, Eric “Ezikuhl” Boone, Krizz Kaliko and Smackola of Dirty Wormz. All songs on the EP were produced by Seven.

Commercial performance 
Boiling Point debuted at #30 on the Billboard 200 selling 13,000 copies in its first week.

Track listing
All tracks are produced by Seven

References

Tech N9ne EPs
2012 EPs
Hip hop EPs
Albums produced by Seven (record producer)
Strange Music EPs